Chigira Jinsentei is the oldest ryokan (Japanese inn) in Ikaho, the part of Shibukawa city, Gunma Prefecture.

The basic facts:

in 1502 the ryokan was founded in Ikaho, utilizing the Ikaho Onsen for the hot spring baths
local onsen is about 2000 years old, noted already in Man'yōshū, the ancient Japanese poetry collection
in 1900 popular writer Kenjirō Tokutomi wrote here his book Hototogisu
the building was reconstructed after a fire about 100 years ago
the reddish-brown spring water can help with feminine diseases.

See also 
List of oldest companies

References

External links 
Homepage

Ryokan
Hotels in Gunma Prefecture
Companies based in Gunma Prefecture
Companies established in the 16th century
1500s establishments in Japan